Sprendlingen-Gensingen is a Verbandsgemeinde ("collective municipality") in the district Mainz-Bingen, in Rhineland-Palatinate, Germany. Sprendlingen is the seat of the municipality.

The Verbandsgemeinde Sprendlingen-Gensingen consists of the following Ortsgemeinden ("local municipalities"): 
 Aspisheim
 Badenheim
 Gensingen
 Grolsheim
 Horrweiler
 Sankt Johann
 Sprendlingen
 Welgesheim
 Wolfsheim
 Zotzenheim

References

Verbandsgemeinde in Rhineland-Palatinate